Züssow is a municipality in the Vorpommern-Greifswald district, in Mecklenburg-Vorpommern, Germany.

Transport
Züssow railway station connects Züssow with Stralsund, Greifswald Angermünde, Eberswalde and Berlin. The station is also served by ICE, EuroCity and Intercity services connecting the area with cities in Germany and the Czech Republic. Züssow is also the station where trains for the island of Usedom connect with trains on the mainland.

References

Vorpommern-Greifswald